Victorina Durán Cebrián (11 December 1899 – 10 December 1993) was a Spanish set and costume designer, chair of costumes and scenography at the National Conservatory, and avant-garde artist associated with the surrealist movement of the 1920s and 30s. After going into exile in Argentina, she became director of the Teatro Colón in Buenos Aires.

Biography

Born into a bourgeois, traditionalist, and cultured family – owners of the Teatro Real's number 1 season ticket – Victorina Durán was the daughter of a dancer of that theater and a career soldier. When her desire to be an actress was rejected by the family, she consoled herself with studying drawing and painting. That led her to meet and interact with characters such as Salvador Dalí, Remedios Varo, Maruja Mallo, and Rosa Chacel. After completing her studies at the Real Academia de Bellas Artes de San Fernando in Madrid from 1917 to 1926, in 1929 she won the Chair of Costumes and Scenographic Art, becoming the first woman to obtain this position in Spain.

Durán had previously distinguished herself as a batik artist, forming part of the Spanish delegation at the International Exhibition of Modern Decorative and Industrial Arts of Paris in 1925.

She also made sets and decorations for films such as Blood Wedding.

As a decorator and scenographer in 1930s Spain, Durán freed herself from the "archeology of the naturalist school", creating an innovative blend of "avant-garde and popular costumbrismo".

After the Spanish Civil War erupted, in 1937 she accompanied Margarita Xirgu in her American exile and took up residence in Argentina. In that country, she simultaneously played the role of artistic director of the Colón and Cervantes theaters. In collaboration with Susana Aquino she inspired the creation of La Cuarta Carabela, the Spanish Association of Seven Arts, the Indigenous Theater Group, and worked as a costume designer with the choreographer Mercedes Quintana. As a painter she exhibited in countries such as Uruguay, Brazil, Chile, Germany, and France.

She broke her exile in 1949 to collaborate with Dalí on the Don Juan Tenorio directed by Luis Escobar Kirkpatrick at the National Theater of Spain. From then on, she traveled frequently to Europe – especially Paris and Madrid – and in the 1980s she settled permanently in the Spanish capital.

She died in Madrid at age 93. Her epitaph contains the following caption: "I do not know if I will have stopped loving for having died, or I will have died for having stopped loving." In her memoirs, she expressed her "passionate militancy in lesbianism in the context of a stale and intolerant Spain."

The life and work of Victorina Durán has been the subject of study. Eva María Moreno Lago presented the doctoral thesis Victorina Durán escritora y artista del teatro de vanguardia at the University of Seville in 2018.

References

External links

 "Eva Moreno Lago: 'Victorina Durán: figurinista y surrealista en el teatro español del '27'", Casariche Cursos de Verano Conferencias, at YouTube

1899 births
1993 deaths
20th-century Spanish painters
Artists from Madrid
Exiles of the Spanish Civil War in Argentina
Lesbian painters
Spanish LGBT painters
Spanish lesbian artists
Real Academia de Bellas Artes de San Fernando alumni
Spanish costume designers
Spanish scenic designers
Spanish surrealist artists
Women scenic designers
Women surrealist artists
LGBT history in Spain
20th-century Spanish LGBT people